Diesel is a Dutch pop/rock group that became one of the relatively few Dutch acts to chart in the U.S. when their song "Sausalito Summernight" entered the U.S. Top 40 in 1981.

Origin and history
Diesel was created in October 1978 by ex-Kayak drummer Pim Koopman.  The group, at first no more than a hobby project, initially consisted of Koopman (drums, keyboard and vocals) and Rob Vunderink (guitar/lead vocals, composer and lyricist), Mark Boon (guitar, composer and lyricist), and Frank Papendrecht (bass; 10 May 1953 – 18 November 2009).  Their first album, Watts in a Tank, was released in the Netherlands in 1980.  One of its tracks, "Going Back to China" was released in the Netherlands as a single in 1979 and became a top 40 hit.  Two other singles from this album, "Down In The Silvermine" and "Sausalito Summernight" (also misspelled "Sausolito Summernight"), were released in 1980 and also became charting hits.  In late 1980, Boon and Papendrecht left to join Meike Touw's Tutti Frutti. They were replaced by bass player Wijnand Ott and guitarist Hugo de Bruin.  In mid-1981, Koopman left the band and Kim Weemhoff took the drumseat.

In 1981, Watts in a Tank was released in the United States.  The single "Sausalito Summernight" rose to #25 on the US Top 40. It reached #1 in Canada. Watts in a Tank itself went up to #68 on the Billboard 200.  This success prompted the return of Mark Boon and an American tour. At Boon's suggestion, guitarist Bas Krumperman joined the band just before the North American tour, moving the band's sound in a country-rock direction. The band got a distribution deal with Atco Records and recorded another album, Unleaded, in 1982, but it was not a success. In the next few years the group had many new members, such as Leen Barbier (guitar/vocals), André Versluijs (bass), Jan Loomans (guitar/vocals), and Henk Hager (guitar/vocals), and released several more singles before disbanding in 1985.

Reunions
Diesel was reconstituted in 1988 and had a hit in the Netherlands with their single "Samantha", sung by Jeroen Englebert.  The band broke up again in 1989.
Mark Boon later formed The Zoo, releasing the album What's in the Package. Diesel reformed in 2000 with Koopman, Vunderink, Versluijs, Thomas Kroon (drums) and Otto Lenselink (guitar).  They released Diesel On The Rocks in 2001, with covers, previously recorded material, and three new tracks.

Watts in a Tank was reissued in 2002, including the original five-minute version of "Sausalito Summernight".

In 2004, the original lineup of Boon, Koopman, Papendrecht and Vunderink performed at a charity event, which led to plans to reform the group on a permanent basis. Papendrecht was replaced later by Werner Cornand.

Both members of Diesel's original rhythm section died from heart attacks within one week: Frank Papendrecht on 18 November 2009 at age 56, and Pim Koopman on 23 November 2009, also at age 56.

In March 2017 Diesel released a single, "Like Hell I Will!."

Discography

Albums

Year-end album charts

Singles

References

External links
 Diesel
 Video: Sausalito Summernight

Dutch rock music groups
Nederpop
Musical groups established in 1978
Musical groups disestablished in 1985
Musical groups established in 1988
Musical groups disestablished in 1989
Musical groups established in 2004
Musical groups disestablished in 2007
Musical groups established in 2016